"Treat Her Like a Lady" is a 1984 single by American vocal group by the Temptations. Released on November 6, 1984 but airplay October 1984, this is the first single on which Ali-Ollie Woodson was lead singer. The song appears on Temptations' album Truly for You, also released in 1984. The song was co-written by Woodson and Otis Williams, and was co-produced by Woodson and former Earth, Wind & Fire member Al McKay and Ralph Johnson.

Background
The single was the Temptations' biggest success on R&B radio since 1975, reaching #2 on the R&B Charts, and just missing the Pop Top 40 at #48. It also reached #12 on the UK Singles Chart.

Chart history

Legacy
"Treat Her Like A Lady" was heard in the 1985 film The Last Dragon during the Sum Dum Goy Fortune Cookie Company scene.  However, the song was not included in the film's soundtrack.
The song appeared on a 1997 episode of The Jamie Foxx Show in which Woodson guest stars playing the piano when Jamie (Jamie Foxx) is mistakenly committed to the psychiatric ward.
The song was covered in 2017 by R&B artist Kyle Maack featuring The Temptations on background vocals.

References

1984 singles
Songs written by Otis Williams
The Temptations songs
Motown singles
1984 songs